Julien Pierre-Eugène Havet (4 April 1853 – 19 August 1893), French historian, was born at Vitry-sur-Seine, the second son of Ernest Havet.

He early showed a remarkable aptitude for learning, but had a pronounced aversion for pure rhetoric. His studies at the École des chartes (where he took first place both upon entering and leaving) and at the École des Hautes Études did much to develop his critical faculty, and the historical method taught and practiced at these establishments brought home to him the dignity of history, which thenceforth became his ruling passion.

Havet's valedictory thesis at the École des chartes, Série chronologique des gardiens et seigneurs des Îles normandes (1876), was a definitive work, slightly affected by later research. In 1878 he followed his thesis with a study called Les Cours royales dans les Îles normandes. Both works were composed entirely from the original documents at the Public Record Office in London and the archives of Jersey and Guernsey.

On the history of Merovingian institutions, Havet's conclusions were widely accepted (see La Formule N. rex Francor). Posthumously, his published and unpublished writings were collected and, with the exception of Les Cours royales des Îles normandes and Lettres de Gerbert, were published in two volumes called Questions mérovingiennes and Opuscules inédits (1896), containing important papers on diplomatics and on Carolingian and Merovingian history, as well as a large number of short monographs covering a variety of subjects.

Friends of Havet published a collection of his articles under the title Mélanges Havet (1895), pre-fixed by a bibliography of his works compiled by his friend Henri Omont.

References

1853 births
1893 deaths
People from Vitry-sur-Seine
19th-century French historians
French medievalists
University of Paris alumni
École Nationale des Chartes alumni
French male non-fiction writers
19th-century French male writers